Kim Chang Wan (born February 22, 1954) is a South Korean singer, composer, musician, actor, host, radio DJ and writer.

Career

Sanulrim 
Kim Chang-wan, along with his younger brothers Kim Chang-hoon and Kim Chang-ik, began composing music during their mid-teens, and formed the band Mui when they were college students. After Kim Chang-wan graduated in 1975 from Seoul National University (with a bachelor's degree in Agricultural Studies, major in Natural Fiber), they went professional and changed their band's name to Sanulrim (meaning "Mountain Echo"). With Kim Chang-wan as lead vocalist and guitarist, Kim Chang-hoon on rhythm guitar, bass and keyboards, and Kim Chang-ik on drums, they released their first album What, Already? in 1977, which became a critical and commercial success. The band's psychedelic rock/hard rock sound (reminiscent of the Sex Pistols) was music Koreans hadn't heard before, and Sanulrim revitalized the Korean music scene, which was currently devastated after several major musicians were arrested for marijuana possession in the 1970s. From 1977 to 1984, they released more than 10 albums and became one of the most influential and beloved figures in the Korean rock music scene. With the K-pop retrospective boom during the 1990s, all of their albums were reissued and a tribute album was released. They held a 30th anniversary concert in 2007 and made plans to release a 14th album. But drummer Kim Chang-ik was killed in a traffic accident in Vancouver, British Columbia, Canada on January 29, 2008, and Sanulrim disbanded after his death.

Solo artist 
Having worked as a music director and film score composer in the early 1990s, Kim Chang-wan also began acting onscreen. He has appeared in supporting roles in film and television, notably in dramedy The Happy Funeral Director, omnibus Beating Heart, medical drama Behind the White Tower, and romantic comedies Coffee Prince, Queen of Housewives, and My Love from the Star. In 2013, he played the leading role of a psychopathic plastic surgeon in the slasher film Doctor. The versatile Kim has also starred in a stage play (A Nap in 2010), hosted variety shows and radio programs, and written several books (some containing poetry). His 1990 book I Want to Live Just Until 20 Years Old was adapted into a 1992 film.

In 2008, he founded the eponymous Kim Chang-wan Band, with himself on vocals, keyboardist Lee Sang-hoon, bassist Choi Won-sik, drummer Kang Yoon-gi and guitarist Yeom Min-yeol. They have released one album, Bus, and several EPs. Kim also contributes to soundtracks and collaborates with younger artists, such as IU.

Discography

Filmography

Television series

Film

Television and radio shows

Theater

Books

Awards and nominations

References

External links
  
 
 
 

1954 births
Living people
South Korean male singers
South Korean rock singers
South Korean singer-songwriters
South Korean composers
South Korean male television actors
South Korean male film actors
South Korean male stage actors
Seoul National University alumni
South Korean male singer-songwriters